Commodore Sir James Maxwell Ramsay,  (27 August 1916 – 1 May 1986) was a senior officer in the Royal Australian Navy and the 20th Governor of Queensland, serving from 22 April 1977 until 21 July 1985.

Ramsay was one of six surviving children. He attended the Macquarie Street State School and The Hutchins School in Hobart. He proved himself to be quite adept at what he attempted in these schools; he was successful in becoming a cadet captain, excelled in Rugby, and was a high achiever in academic and professional subjects. Appointed a naval cadet on 1 January 1930, he graduated from the Royal Australian Naval College at Flinders Naval Depot in 1933 and was appointed a midshipman on 1 May 1934. He had a distinguished naval career. In 1945 Ramsay attended Royal Naval Staff College, Greenwich, England, and in the same year married Janet Grace Burley. During the Second World War he served on British and Australian ships in the Indian, Atlantic, and Pacific Oceans, and 1972 he retired from the navy. He served as Lieutenant-Governor of Western Australia from 1974 until 1977.

Ramsay married Janet Burley, a Red Cross welfare officer, on 24 November 1945 at the parish church, Denham, Buckinghamshire.

References

1916 births
1986 deaths
Australian Commanders of the Order of the British Empire
Australian Knights Bachelor
Australian Knights Commander of the Order of St Michael and St George
Australian Knights Commander of the Royal Victorian Order
Australian military personnel of the Korean War
Australian recipients of the Distinguished Service Cross (United Kingdom)
Governors of Queensland
Graduates of the Royal Australian Naval College
Officers of the Legion of Merit
People from Hobart
Royal Australian Navy officers
Royal Australian Navy personnel of World War II